Harold Dean may refer to:

 Harold Dean (footballer) (1910–?), English footballer
 Harold Dean (politician) (1913–1997), Queensland politician
 Harold I. Dean (1884–1949), American football and college basketball coach